This is a list of the mammal species recorded in Senegal. Of the mammal species in Senegal, one is critically endangered, three are endangered, eleven are vulnerable, and three are near threatened. One of the species listed for Senegal can no longer be found in the wild.

The following tags are used to highlight each species' conservation status as assessed by the International Union for Conservation of Nature:

Some species were assessed using an earlier set of criteria. Species assessed using this system have the following instead of near threatened and least concern categories:

Order: Tubulidentata (aardvarks) 

The order Tubulidentata consists of a single species, the aardvark. Tubulidentata are characterised by their teeth which lack a pulp cavity and form thin tubes which are continuously worn down and replaced.

Family: Orycteropodidae
Genus: Orycteropus
 Aardvark, O. afer

Order: Hyracoidea (hyraxes) 

The hyraxes are any of four species of fairly small, thickset, herbivorous mammals in the order Hyracoidea. About the size of a domestic cat they are well-furred, with rounded bodies and a stumpy tail. They are native to Africa and the Middle East.

Family: Procaviidae (hyraxes)
Genus: Dendrohyrax
 Western tree hyrax, D. dorsalis 
Genus: Procavia
 Cape hyrax, P. capensis

Order: Proboscidea (elephants) 
The elephants comprise three living species and are the largest living land animals.

Family: Elephantidae (elephants)
Genus: Loxodonta
African forest elephant, L. cyclotis

Order: Sirenia (manatees and dugongs) 

Sirenia is an order of fully aquatic, herbivorous mammals that inhabit rivers, estuaries, coastal marine waters, swamps, and marine wetlands. All four species are endangered.

Family: Trichechidae
Genus: Trichechus
 African manatee, Trichechus senegalensis VU

Order: Primates 

The order Primates contains humans and their closest relatives: lemurs, lorisoids, tarsiers, monkeys, and apes.

Suborder: Strepsirrhini
Infraorder: Lemuriformes
Superfamily: Lorisoidea
Family: Lorisidae
Genus: Perodicticus
 Potto, Perodicticus potto LC
Family: Galagidae
Genus: Galago
 Senegal bushbaby, Galago senegalensis LC
Suborder: Haplorhini
Infraorder: Simiiformes
Parvorder: Catarrhini
Superfamily: Cercopithecoidea
Family: Cercopithecidae (Old World monkeys)
Genus: Erythrocebus
 Patas monkey, Erythrocebus patas LC
Genus: Chlorocebus
 Green monkey, Chlorocebus sabaeus LC
Genus: Cercopithecus
 Campbell's mona monkey, Cercopithecus campbelli VU
 Lesser spot-nosed monkey, Cercopithecus petaurista LC
Genus: Papio
 Guinea baboon, Papio papio NT
Genus: Cercocebus
 Sooty mangabey, Cercocebus atys NT
Subfamily: Colobinae
Genus: Colobus
 King colobus, Colobus polykomos VU
Genus: Procolobus
 Red colobus, Procolobus badius EN
Superfamily: Hominoidea
Family: Hominidae (great apes)
Subfamily: Homininae
Tribe: Panini
Genus: Pan
 Common chimpanzee, Pan troglodytes EN

Order: Rodentia (rodents) 
Rodents make up the largest order of mammals, with over 40% of mammalian species. They have two incisors in the upper and lower jaw which grow continually and must be kept short by gnawing. Most rodents are small though the capybara can weigh up to 45 kg (100 lb).

Suborder: Hystricomorpha
Family: Hystricidae (Old World porcupines)
Genus: Hystrix
 Crested porcupine, Hystrix cristata LC
Family: Ctenodactylidae
Genus: Felovia
 Felou gundi, Felovia vae DD
Family: Thryonomyidae (cane rats)
Genus: Thryonomys
 Greater cane rat, Thryonomys swinderianus LC
Suborder: Sciurognathi
Family: Anomaluridae
Subfamily: Anomalurinae
Genus: Anomalurops
 Beecroft's scaly-tailed squirrel, Anomalurops beecrofti LC
Family: Sciuridae (squirrels)
Subfamily: Xerinae
Tribe: Xerini
Genus: Xerus
 Striped ground squirrel, Xerus erythropus LC
Tribe: Protoxerini
Genus: Funisciurus
 Fire-footed rope squirrel, Funisciurus pyrropus LC
Genus: Heliosciurus
 Gambian sun squirrel, Heliosciurus gambianus LC
 Red-legged sun squirrel, Heliosciurus rufobrachium LC
Family: Gliridae (dormice)
Subfamily: Graphiurinae
Genus: Graphiurus
 Kellen's dormouse, Graphiurus kelleni LC
Family: Dipodidae (jerboas)
Subfamily: Dipodinae
Genus: Jaculus
 Lesser Egyptian jerboa, Jaculus jaculus LC
Family: Nesomyidae
Subfamily: Dendromurinae
Genus: Steatomys
 Northwestern fat mouse, Steatomys caurinus LC
 Dainty fat mouse, Steatomys cuppedius LC
Subfamily: Cricetomyinae
Genus: Cricetomys
 Gambian pouched rat, Cricetomys gambianus LC
Family: Muridae (mice, rats, voles, gerbils, hamsters, etc.)
Subfamily: Deomyinae
Genus: Uranomys
 Rudd's mouse, Uranomys ruddi LC
Subfamily: Gerbillinae
Genus: Desmodilliscus
 Pouched gerbil, Desmodilliscus braueri LC
Genus: Gerbillus
 Pygmy gerbil, Gerbillus henleyi LC
 Tarabul's gerbil, Gerbillus tarabuli LC
Genus: Gerbilliscus
 Kemp's gerbil, Gerbilliscus kempi LC
 Guinean gerbil, Gerbilliscus guineae LC
Genus: Taterillus
 Gracile tateril, Taterillus gracilis LC
 Senegal gerbil, Taterillus pygargus LC
Subfamily: Murinae
Genus: Arvicanthis
 Sudanian grass rat, Arvicanthis ansorgei LC
 African grass rat, Arvicanthis niloticus LC
Genus: Dasymys
 West African shaggy rat, Dasymys rufulus LC
Genus: Grammomys
 Bunting's thicket rat, Grammomys buntingi DD
Genus: Lemniscomys
 Senegal one-striped grass mouse, Lemniscomys linulus DD
 Heuglin's striped grass mouse, Lemniscomys zebra LC
Genus: Mastomys
 Guinea multimammate mouse, Mastomys erythroleucus LC
 Hubert's multimammate mouse, Mastomys huberti LC
 Natal multimammate mouse, Mastomys natalensis LC
Genus: Mus
 Hausa mouse, Mus haussa LC
 Matthey's mouse, Mus mattheyi LC
 African pygmy mouse, Mus minutoides LC
Genus: Praomys
 Dalton's mouse, Praomys daltoni LC
 Tullberg's soft-furred mouse, Praomys tullbergi LC

Order: Lagomorpha (lagomorphs) 

The lagomorphs comprise two families, Leporidae with hares and rabbits, and Ochotonidae with pikas. Though they can resemble rodents, and were classified as a superfamily in that order until the early 20th century, they have since been considered a separate order. They differ from rodents in a number of physical characteristics, such as having four incisors in the upper jaw rather than two.

Family: Leporidae
Genus: Lepus
 Cape hare, Lepus capensis LC
 African savanna hare, Lepus microtis LC

Order: Erinaceomorpha (hedgehogs and gymnures) 

The order Erinaceomorpha contains a single family, Erinaceidae, which comprise the hedgehogs and gymnures. The hedgehogs are easily recognised by their spines while gymnures look more like large rats.

Family: Erinaceidae (hedgehogs)
Subfamily: Erinaceinae
Genus: Atelerix
 Four-toed hedgehog, Atelerix albiventris LC

Order: Soricomorpha (shrews, moles, and solenodons) 
The "shrew-forms" are insectivorous mammals. The shrews and solenodons closely resemble mice while the moles are stout-bodied burrowers.

Family: Soricidae (shrews)
Subfamily: Crocidurinae
Genus: Crocidura
 Cinderella shrew, Crocidura cinderella LC
 Fox's shrew, Crocidura foxi LC
 Bicolored musk shrew, Crocidura fuscomurina LC
 Lamotte's shrew, Crocidura lamottei LC
 Mauritanian shrew, Crocidura lusitania LC
 Savanna dwarf shrew, Crocidura nanilla LC
 African giant shrew, Crocidura olivieri LC
 Desert musk shrew, Crocidura smithii LC
 Savanna path shrew, Crocidura viaria LC

Order: Chiroptera (bats) 

The bats' most distinguishing feature is that their forelimbs are developed as wings, making them the only mammals capable of flight. Bat species account for about 20% of all mammals.

Family: Pteropodidae (flying foxes, Old World fruit bats)
Subfamily: Pteropodinae
Genus: Eidolon
 Straw-coloured fruit bat, Eidolon helvum LC
Genus: Epomophorus
 Gambian epauletted fruit bat, Epomophorus gambianus LC
Genus: Epomops
 Buettikofer's epauletted fruit bat, Epomops buettikoferi LC
Genus: Lissonycteris
 Smith's fruit bat, Lissonycteris smithi LC
Genus: Micropteropus
 Peters's dwarf epauletted fruit bat, Micropteropus pusillus LC
Genus: Rousettus
 Egyptian fruit bat, Rousettus aegyptiacus LC
Family: Vespertilionidae
Subfamily: Myotinae
Genus: Myotis
 Rufous mouse-eared bat, Myotis bocagii LC
Subfamily: Vespertilioninae
Genus: Barbastella
 Barbastelle, Barbastella barbastellus VU
Genus: Eptesicus
 Lagos serotine, Eptesicus platyops DD
Genus: Glauconycteris
 Abo bat, Glauconycteris poensis LC
 Butterfly bat, Glauconycteris variegata LC
Genus: Neoromicia
 Tiny serotine, Neoromicia guineensis LC
 Banana pipistrelle, Neoromicia nanus LC
 Rendall's serotine, Neoromicia rendalli LC
 Somali serotine, Neoromicia somalicus LC
 White-winged serotine, Neoromicia tenuipinnis LC
Genus: Nycticeinops
 Schlieffen's bat, Nycticeinops schlieffeni LC
Genus: Pipistrellus
 Egyptian pipistrelle, Pipistrellus deserti LC
 Tiny pipistrelle, Pipistrellus nanulus LC
 Rüppell's pipistrelle, Pipistrellus rueppelli LC
 Rusty pipistrelle, Pipistrellus rusticus LC
Genus: Scotoecus
 Light-winged lesser house bat, Scotoecus albofuscus DD
 Dark-winged lesser house bat, Scotoecus hirundo DD
Genus: Scotophilus
 African yellow bat, Scotophilus dinganii LC
 White-bellied yellow bat, Scotophilus leucogaster LC
 Schreber's yellow bat, Scotophilus nigrita NT
 Greenish yellow bat, Scotophilus viridis LC
Family: Rhinopomatidae
Genus: Rhinopoma
 Greater mouse-tailed bat, Rhinopoma microphyllum LC
Family: Molossidae
Genus: Chaerephon
 Gland-tailed free-tailed bat, Chaerephon bemmeleni LC
 Little free-tailed bat, Chaerephon pumila LC
Genus: Mops
 Angolan free-tailed bat, Mops condylurus LC
 Midas free-tailed bat, Mops midas LC
Genus: Myopterus
 Daubenton's free-tailed bat, Myopterus daubentonii NT
Family: Emballonuridae
Genus: Taphozous
 Mauritian tomb bat, Taphozous mauritianus LC
 Naked-rumped tomb bat, Taphozous nudiventris LC
 Egyptian tomb bat, Taphozous perforatus LC
Family: Nycteridae
Genus: Nycteris
 Gambian slit-faced bat, Nycteris gambiensis LC
 Large slit-faced bat, Nycteris grandis LC
 Hairy slit-faced bat, Nycteris hispida LC
 Large-eared slit-faced bat, Nycteris macrotis LC
 Egyptian slit-faced bat, Nycteris thebaica LC
Family: Megadermatidae
Genus: Lavia
 Yellow-winged bat, Lavia frons LC
Family: Rhinolophidae
Subfamily: Rhinolophinae
Genus: Rhinolophus
 Halcyon horseshoe bat, Rhinolophus alcyone LC
 Rüppell's horseshoe bat, Rhinolophus fumigatus LC
 Guinean horseshoe bat, Rhinolophus guineensis VU
 Lander's horseshoe bat, Rhinolophus landeri LC
Subfamily: Hipposiderinae
Genus: Asellia
 Trident leaf-nosed bat, Asellia tridens LC
Genus: Hipposideros
 Aba roundleaf bat, Hipposideros abae NT
 Sundevall's roundleaf bat, Hipposideros caffer LC
 Cyclops roundleaf bat, Hipposideros cyclops LC
 Giant roundleaf bat, Hipposideros gigas LC
 Noack's roundleaf bat, Hipposideros ruber LC

Order: Pholidota (pangolins) 
The order Pholidota comprises the eight species of pangolin. Pangolins are anteaters and have the powerful claws, elongated snout and long tongue seen in the other unrelated anteater species.
Family: Manidae
Genus: Manis
Giant pangolin, M. gigantea 
 Long-tailed pangolin, M. tetradactyla VU
 Tree pangolin, M. tricuspis VU

Order: Cetacea (whales) 

The order Cetacea includes whales, dolphins and porpoises. They are the mammals most fully adapted to aquatic life with a spindle-shaped nearly hairless body, protected by a thick layer of blubber, and forelimbs and tail modified to provide propulsion underwater.

Suborder: Mysticeti
Family: Balaenopteridae
Subfamily: Balaenopterinae
Genus: Balaenoptera
 Common minke whale, Balaenoptera acutorostrata VU
 Sei whale, Balaenoptera borealis EN
 Bryde's whale, Balaenoptera brydei EN
 Blue whale, Balaenoptera musculus EN
 Fin whale, Balaenoptera physalus EN
Subfamily: Megapterinae
Genus: Megaptera
 Humpback whale, Megaptera novaeangliae VU
Family: Balaenidae (right whales)
Genus: Eubalaena
 North Atlantic right whale CR (Seen historically)
Suborder: Odontoceti
Superfamily: Platanistoidea
Family: Phocoenidae
Genus: Phocoena
 Harbour porpoise, Phocoena phocoena VU
Family: Physeteridae
Genus: Physeter
 Sperm whale, Physeter macrocephalus VU
Family: Kogiidae
Genus: Kogia
 Pygmy sperm whale, Kogia breviceps DD
 Dwarf sperm whale, Kogia sima DD
Family: Ziphidae
Genus: Mesoplodon
 Blainville's beaked whale, Mesoplodon densirostris DD
 Gervais' beaked whale, Mesoplodon europaeus DD
Genus: Ziphius
 Cuvier's beaked whale, Ziphius cavirostris DD
Family: Delphinidae (marine dolphins)
Genus: Orcinus
 Killer whale, Orcinus orca DD
Genus: Feresa
 Pygmy killer whale, Feresa attenuata DD
Genus: Pseudorca
 False killer whale, Pseudorca crassidens DD
Genus: Delphinus
 Short-beaked common dolphin, Delphinus delphis LR/cd
Genus: Lagenodelphis
 Fraser's dolphin, Lagenodelphis hosei DD
Genus: Stenella
 Pantropical spotted dolphin, Stenella attenuata LR/cd
 Clymene dolphin, Stenella clymene DD
 Striped dolphin, Stenella coeruleoalba DD
 Atlantic spotted dolphin, Stenella frontalis DD
 Spinner dolphin, Stenella longirostris LR/cd
Genus: Steno
 Rough-toothed dolphin, Steno bredanensis DD
Genus: Tursiops
 Common bottlenose dolphin, Tursiops truncatus LC
Genus: Globicephala
 Short-finned pilot whale, Globicephala macrorhynchus DD
Genus: Grampus
 Risso's dolphin, Grampus griseus DD
Genus: Peponocephala
 Melon-headed whale, Peponocephala electra DD

Order: Carnivora (carnivorans) 

There are over 260 species of carnivorans, the majority of which feed primarily on meat. They have a characteristic skull shape and dentition.
Suborder: Feliformia
Family: Felidae (cats)
Subfamily: Felinae
Genus: Caracal
African golden cat, C. aurata  presence uncertain
Caracal, C. caracal 
Genus: Felis
African wildcat, F. lybica 
Genus: Leptailurus
 Serval, Leptailurus serval LC
Subfamily: Pantherinae
Genus: Panthera
 Lion, Panthera leo VU
 Leopard, Panthera pardus VU
Family: Viverridae
Subfamily: Viverrinae
Genus: Civettictis
 African civet, Civettictis civetta LC
Genus: Genetta
 Common genet, Genetta genetta LC
 Rusty-spotted genet, Genetta maculata LC
 Hausa genet, Genetta thierryi LC
Family: Nandiniidae
Genus: Nandinia
 African palm civet, Nandinia binotata LC
Family: Herpestidae (mongooses)
Genus: Atilax
 Marsh mongoose, Atilax paludinosus LC
Genus: Herpestes
 Egyptian mongoose, Herpestes ichneumon LC
Common slender mongoose, Herpestes sanguineus LC
Genus: Ichneumia
 White-tailed mongoose, Ichneumia albicauda LC
Genus: Mungos
 Gambian mongoose, Mungos gambianus DD
 Banded mongoose, Mungos mungo LC
Family: Hyaenidae (hyaenas)
Genus: Crocuta
 Spotted hyena, Crocuta crocuta LC
Genus: Hyaena
 Striped hyena, Hyaena hyaena NT
Suborder: Caniformia
Family: Canidae (dogs, foxes)
Genus: Vulpes
 Pale fox, Vulpes pallida DD
Genus: Canis
 African golden wolf, Canis lupaster LC
Genus: Lupulella
 Side-striped jackal, L. adusta  
Genus: Lycaon
 African wild dog, Lycaon pictus EN
Family: Mustelidae (mustelids)
Genus: Ictonyx
 Striped polecat, Ictonyx striatus LC
Genus: Mellivora
 Honey badger, Mellivora capensis LC
Genus: Aonyx
 African clawless otter, Aonyx capensis LC
Family: Phocidae (earless seals)
Genus: Monachus
 Mediterranean monk seal, M. monachus  extirpated

Order: Artiodactyla (even-toed ungulates) 

The even-toed ungulates are ungulates whose weight is borne about equally by the third and fourth toes, rather than mostly or entirely by the third as in perissodactyls. There are about 220 artiodactyl species, including many that are of great economic importance to humans.

Family: Suidae (pigs)
Subfamily: Phacochoerinae
Genus: Phacochoerus
 Common warthog, Phacochoerus africanus LC
Subfamily: Suinae
Genus: Potamochoerus
 Red river hog, Potamochoerus porcus LC
Family: Hippopotamidae (hippopotamuses)
Genus: Hippopotamus
 Hippopotamus, Hippopotamus amphibius VU
Family: Tragulidae
Genus: Hyemoschus
 Water chevrotain, Hyemoschus aquaticus DD
Family: Giraffidae (giraffe, okapi)
Genus: Giraffa
 Giraffe, Giraffa camelopardalis VU extirpated
Family: Bovidae (cattle, antelope, sheep, goats)
Subfamily: Alcelaphinae
Genus: Alcelaphus
 Hartebeest, Alcelaphus buselaphus LC
Genus: Damaliscus
 Topi, Damaliscus lunatus LC
Subfamily: Antilopinae
Genus: Gazella
 Dorcas gazelle, Gazella dorcas VU reintroduced
 Red-fronted gazelle, Gazella rufifrons VU
Genus: Nanger
 Dama gazelle, Nanger dama CR extirpated
Genus: Ourebia
 Oribi, Ourebia ourebi LC
Subfamily: Bovinae
Genus: Syncerus
 African buffalo, Syncerus caffer LC
Genus: Tragelaphus
 Giant eland, Tragelaphus derbianus LR/nt
 Bushbuck, Tragelaphus scriptus LR/lc
 Sitatunga, Tragelaphus spekii LR/nt
Subfamily: Cephalophinae
Genus: Cephalophus
 Maxwell's duiker, Cephalophus maxwellii LR/nt
 Red-flanked duiker, Cephalophus rufilatus LR/cd
 Yellow-backed duiker, Cephalophus silvicultor LR/nt
Genus: Sylvicapra
 Common duiker, Sylvicapra grimmia LC
Subfamily: Hippotraginae
Genus: Hippotragus
 Roan antelope, Hippotragus equinus LC
Genus: Oryx
 Scimitar oryx, Oryx dammah EW
Subfamily: Reduncinae
Genus: Kobus
 Waterbuck, Kobus ellipsiprymnus LC
 Kob, Kobus kob LC
Genus: Redunca
 Bohor reedbuck, Redunca redunca LC

References

External links

See also
List of chordate orders
Lists of mammals by region
List of prehistoric mammals
Mammal classification
List of mammals described in the 2000s

Senegal
Senegal

Mammals